The play-offs of the 2016 Fed Cup Asia/Oceania Zone Group II were the final stages of the Group II Zonal Competition involving teams from Asia and Oceania. Using the positions determined in their pools, the eleven teams faced off to determine their placing in the 2016 Fed Cup Asia/Oceania Zone Group II. The top team advanced to Asia/Oceania Group I in 2017.

Pool results

Promotion play-off 
The first placed teams of the pools were drawn in a head-to-head round. The winner advanced to Group I in 2017.

Philippines vs. Singapore

3rd to 4th play-offs
The second placed teams of the pools were drawn in a head-to-head round to determine the third and fourth placed teams.

Hong Kong vs. Malaysia

5th to 6th play-offs 
The third placed teams of the pools were drawn in a head-to-head round to determine the fifth and sixth placed teams.

Pacific Oceania vs. Indonesia

7th to 8th play-offs 
The fourth placed teams of the pools were drawn in a head-to-head round of determine the seventh and eighth placed teams.

Iran vs. Sri Lanka

9th to 10th play-offs
The fifth placed teams of the pools were drawn in a head-to-head round to determine the ninth and tenth placed teams.

Bahrain vs. Pakistan

Final placements 

  were promoted to Asia/Oceania Group I in 2017.

See also 
 Fed Cup structure

References

External links 
 Fed Cup website

2016 Fed Cup Asia/Oceania Zone